Fly (Songs Inspired by the Film Eddie the Eagle) was released as an accompanying soundtrack to the official film score from Eddie the Eagle. It is a collection of original songs curated by Gary Barlow, and includes tracks by some of the biggest names in 1980s pop music. The project was kicked off by film producer and director Matthew Vaughn, who asked Barlow to put together the album because he was reluctant to score the film with "overused" 80s hits. Barlow then went in search of his favourite 80s artists, doing his homework, to make sure they could all sing and perform again, by watching up to date YouTube footage.

Holly Johnson released the track "Ascension", co-written with Gary Barlow, as a single on February 3, 2016.

Track listing

References 

Film soundtracks
Gary Barlow